Tyler David Wolff (born February 13, 2003) is an American professional soccer player who plays as a winger for Major League Soccer club Atlanta United.

Career
Born in Snellville, Georgia, Wolff began his career in the youth academy at the Columbus Crew. In 2019, Wolff joined the academy at Atlanta United. After impressing with the under-17s, Wolff made his debut for the club's reserve side Atlanta United 2 on August 8, 2020, in the USL Championship against the Charleston Battery. He started and played 62 minutes as Atlanta United 2 were defeated 1–0.

Atlanta United
On July 2, 2020, Wolff signed a first team contract with Major League Soccer club Atlanta United. Wolff made his debut for the club on September 2 against Inter Miami, coming on as a 63rd minute substitute for Ezequiel Barco in a 0–0 draw. He then scored his first professional goal for Atlanta United 2, the club's reserve affiliate in the USL Championship, on May 15, 2021, against OKC Energy. His goal was an 89th-minute equalizer in a 2–2 away draw. Wolff scored a hat-trick for Atlanta United 2 on August 8, 2021, in a 6–2 victory against Indy Eleven for which he was awarded USL Championship player of the week for week 16 of the 2021 season.

SK Beveren (loan)
On July 8, 2022, Wolff was loaned to Belgian Challenger Pro League side SK Beveren. After seven substitute appearances, he was recalled on January 4, 2023.

Personal life
Wolff is the eldest son of Austin FC head coach (and longtime USMNT player) Josh Wolff, and his younger brother Owen Wolff currently plays for Austin FC.

Career statistics

Club

Honors
United States U20
CONCACAF U-20 Championship: 2022

References

External links
 Profile at Atlanta United

2003 births
Living people
People from Snellville, Georgia
Sportspeople from Georgia (U.S. state)
American soccer players
Association football forwards
Atlanta United 2 players
Atlanta United FC players
S.K. Beveren players
USL Championship players
Major League Soccer players
Soccer players from Georgia (U.S. state)
Homegrown Players (MLS)
United States men's under-20 international soccer players